The Federal High Court of Ethiopia is the second-level court division in Ethiopia.  The FDRE Constitution delegates judicial jurisdiction to the Federal High Court, along with the First Instance and State Courts. It has its headquarters in Addis Ababa's Lideta district.

Proclamation 
The criminal jurisdiction of the Federal High Court alongside First Instance Court have the following duties and obligations under Federal Courts Proclamation No. 25/1996, which went into effect on 1 December 1998.

In other court system 
The Addis Ababa City Charter established two city courts responsible to municipal jurisdiction: the First Instance and Appellate Courts. Federal High Court also functions in religious courts like Sharia law, as to Federal First Instance Court of Sharia, accountable to the Federal Judicial Administration Commission.

References 

Judiciary of Ethiopia